This is a list of public art in Vilnius', Lithuania.

 1916, 1989: Three Crosses was designed by a Polish-Lithuanian architect and sculptor Antoni Wiwulski in 1916. It was constructed in Kalnai Park on the Hill of Three Crosses, in the place where the three wooden crosses used to stand at least since 1636. It was torn down in 1950 by order of the Soviet Union authorities. A new monument designed by Henrikas Šilgalis was erected in its place in 1989.
 1922: Bust of Stanisław Moniuszko in a park near the Church of St. Catherine (:lt:Vilniaus Šv. Kotrynos bažnyčia) on the Vilnius Street, architect Bolesław Bałzukiewicz. It rests on a pedestal left from the bust to Alexander Pushkin.
 1991: Memorial to victims of mass deportations, Naujoji Vilnia neighborhood by the train station which witnessed thousands of victims of Soviet political repressions in Lithuania deported during 1940-1941. It was the last station in the Lithuanian territory on their way to Siberia and Kazakhstan.
 2005: a memorial plaque of sand-pink marble with a bas-relief of the thinker and medieval scholar Lev Karsavin on the facade of the house at Didžioji Street by sculptor .

A sculpture bench with a guitar in Vilnius in remembrance of singer-songwriter Vytautas Kernagis.

References

Buildings and structures in Vilnius
Art
Tourist attractions in Vilnius